Serhiy Zhyhalov (born 6 January 1983) is a Ukrainian footballer.

Career
He played for FC Tytan Armyansk and FC Metalurh-2 Zaporizhzhia in the Ukrainian Second League as well as several Lithuanian clubs in the A Lyga.

External links 
 
 

1983 births
Living people
Ukrainian footballers
Expatriate footballers in Lithuania
Ukrainian expatriate footballers
A Lyga players
FC Viktor Zaporizhzhia players
FC Metalurh-2 Zaporizhzhia players
FC Tytan Armyansk players
FC Elektrometalurh-NZF Nikopol players
FC Myr Hornostayivka players
FK Sūduva Marijampolė players
FC Tavria-Skif Rozdol players
Association football forwards